Malthe Højholt (born 16 April 2001) is a Danish professional footballer who plays as a midfielder for Danish Superliga club AaB.

Club career
Højholt was born in Hjørring, Denmark, and progressed through the youth teams of Hjørring IF before joining the AaB academy at under-13 level.

He made his Danish Superliga debut for AaB on 20 June 2020 in a game against FC Nordsjælland.

References

External links
 

2001 births
Living people
Danish men's footballers
Denmark youth international footballers
Association football midfielders
Vendsyssel FF players
AaB Fodbold players
Danish Superliga players
People from Hjørring
Sportspeople from the North Jutland Region